Neil Benjamin "Nipper" Trezise  (8 February 1931 – 20 August 2006) was an Australian rules footballer who represented  in the Victorian Football League and later a politician who represented the Labor Party in the Victorian Legislative Assembly. He was of Cornish descent.

Football career
Originally from Redan, Victoria, Trezise played 185 games for 272 goals between 1949 and 1959 at the Geelong Football Club in the VFL. He played in the 1951 and 1952 premiership sides, and in the second round of 1953 kicked eight goals against a champion Footscray defence, who would concede fewer points per match than any other team between 1919 and 2019. Following his retirement in 1959 (a year in which he was Geelong captain), Trezise continued his service to the club, coaching the reserves side, and then becoming club president in 1974.

Commonly called "Nipper", Trezise acquired the nickname as a young recruit at Geelong.

Political career
After leaving football, Trezise pursued a political career with the Labor Party. He stood unsuccessfully for the Victorian Legislative Assembly seat of Geelong in 1961, but won the seat of Geelong West in 1964, and held the seat and its subsequent successor Geelong North until 1992. In 1982 he became Minister for Youth, Sport and Recreation (from 1985 just Minister for Sport and Recreation), a portfolio he held until 1992—throughout the entire terms of Premiers John Cain and Joan Kirner.

Trezise was made a Member of the Order of Australia (AM) in the 1993 Queen's Birthday Honours for "service to the Victorian Parliament and to sport".

His son, Ian Trezise, also entered politics, representing Geelong in the Victorian Legislative Assembly.

Death
Trezise died of a heart attack on 20 August 2006, with his funeral held on 24 August.

Notes

References

External links
 

|-

|-

Geelong Football Club players
Geelong Football Club Premiership players
Geelong Football Club captains
Geelong Football Club coaches
Redan Football Club players
Australian Labor Party members of the Parliament of Victoria
Australian people of Cornish descent
Members of the Victorian Legislative Assembly
Australian rules footballers from Geelong
Australian sportsperson-politicians
1931 births
2006 deaths
Australian rules footballers from Ballarat
20th-century Australian politicians
Members of the Order of Australia
Two-time VFL/AFL Premiership players